Whatchamacallit, a shortened version of "what you may call it", may refer to:

 Whatchamacallit, a placeholder name used for something whose name is unknown
 Whatchamacallit (candy), a candy bar made by The Hershey Company
 Whatchamacallit (album), an album by Brick Layer Cake, or the title track
 "Whatchamacallit", a song from the Pussycat Dolls' album Doll Domination
 "Whatchamacallit", a song by Ella Mai from her 2018 self-titled album